Alamgir Khan (born 17 March) is an Indian playback singer who sings Bollywood, Hindi and Punjabi songs as well as Sufi and Ghazals.He is credited for ad jingle 'Mauka Mauka' conceived  for ICC Cricket World Cup by Star Sports.

Early life and Career 
Alamgir Khan was born in Lalauda village in Nabha city in Patiala district, Punjab. He belongs to a family of traditional folk and classical singers committed to Patiala Gharana and settled in Lalauda village. He started training in classical singing at the age of 14 with his father Ustad Murli Khan, grandfather Ustad Idu Sharif Khan and great grandfather Ustad Karamdeen Khan.

He spent his formative years as an artist in Kalagram residence in Chandigarh. He has also received guidance from the musical maestro and Bollywood playback singer Sukhwinder Singh; Yashwinder Sharma, Programme Officer, North Zone Cultural Centre (NZCC), Kalagram; and standup comedian Khayali Saharan.

He got his first break in the Bollywood films from the music director Himesh Reshammiya who signed hum for 'Desi Beats' in Salman Khan Starrer 'Bodyguard' released in 2011.

Discography

Achievements 
Alamgir Khan was featured in the fifth edition of 'Top 30 Under 30' list released by Hindustan Times in 2015.

References 

Bollywood playback singers
Living people
Year of birth missing (living people)